Leites is a surname. Notable people with the surname include:

Nathan Leites  (1912–1987), American sociologist and politologist of Russian origins.
Thales Leites (born 1981), Brazilian mixed martial artist competing in the Middleweight division of the Ultimate Fighting Championship.

See also
 Leite
 Leiter
 Leitner
Leites Nestlé, Brazilian women's volleyball club.